Typhonia bimaculata is a species of bagworm moth native to Madagascar.

The female has a wingspan of 33 mm, length of the forewings: 16 mm.

Forewings have nine veins, of light brown with a large dark spot in the middle.
Hindwings are darker than the forewings and of shining brown grey.

See also
 List of moths of Madagascar

References
 

Typhonia
Lepidoptera of Madagascar
Moths described in 2010
Moths of Madagascar
Moths of Africa